James Andrews (1801–1876) was an English draughtsman, botanical painter and illustrator noted for his accomplished illustrations.  He also taught flower-painting to young ladies.  He created the illustrations for the famous nature writer Sarah Bowdich Lee's 1854 book Trees, Plants, and Flowers: Their Beauties, Uses, and Influences.

In March 1857, his painting of fruit and a bowl in watercolour received a medal from the Royal Society of Agriculture and Botany in Ghent.

In 1868, Andrews exhibited a piece called Earnest Andrews, a painting of fruit and flowers, at the Royal Academy of Art annual summer exhibition.

Portraiture

Publications 
Flora's Gems with Louisa Anne Twamley
Floral Tableaux Folio, . David Bogue. 1847. Printed by C. Graf.
Ornamental Foliated Plants, London: [E.G. Henderson & Son, 1857-1859]. Zincographs by C.T. Rosenberg, coloured by hand, printed by C.F. Cheffins & Sons.
The Illustrated Bouquet, London 1857-64. Three volumes, folio, . 84 hand-coloured engravings by James Andrews and C.T. Rosenberg, after the art work of Miss Sowerby, Mrs Withers, and James Edwards. Published by Edward George Henderson and Andrew Henderson.
1835 -  Andrew’s Lessons in Painting Flowers – 6 books,  A series of Easy and Progressive studies. Written and drawn by James Andrews,  Publisher Charles Tilt, Fleet Street: John Menzies, Edinburgh; Thomas Wardle, Philadelphia .   One copy is held at the Royal Horticulture Society, Vincent Square, London.  Another copy is held at Edinburgh University, UK
1842 –The Sentiment of Flowers, this work can be found at the Herbarium Library Kew Gardens, England. 
1847- 48  Choice Garden Flowers and Wild Flowers of England  This work can be found at the Herbarium Library Kew Gardens.   This is work is with Rev Robert Tyas  MA FRBS;  Publisher Houlston and Wright, 65 Paternoster Row, MDCCLIX
1848 Favourite Field Flowers and Wild Flowers of England  This work can be found at the Herbarium Library Kew Gardens, England  Publisher Houlston and Stoneman, 65 Paternoster Row, 
1851 Flowers and Heraldry; or, floral emblems and heraldic figures combined to express pure sentiment, kind feelings and excellent principles, in a manner at one simple, elegant and beautiful ….. with  twenty-four  emblazoned plates and drawings and cloured by James Andrews F.R.H.S.    The author is Robert Tyas, (not recorded as Rev Robert Tyas), Publisher Houlston and Stoneman, London .   This work can be found at the British Library London
1857- 1861 Florist, Fruitist and Garden Miscellany – 5 volumes  This work can be found at Herbarium Library Kew Gardens, England.  Publisher  “ Florist “ Office, 28  HenriettaStreet, Covent Garden, London.
1859 Wild Flowers of England series 1+2 in one publication  This work can be found at Herbarium Library Kew Gardens.    Publisher Houlston and Wright; 65 Paternoster Row, London
1862-71 The Floral Magazine volumes 2 – 8.  This work can be found at the Herbarium Library Kew Gardens, England    There are more than 400 plates of Andrews paintings in the 7 volumes. The Rev Henry Honywood  Dombrain was the author of the Floral Magazine. Andrews did not contribute to volume 1. 
1961  Flower portraits. Eva Mannering, publisher The Ariel Press London, this work is at the Herbarium Library at Kew Gardens, England and describes Andrews contribution to botanical art. 
2011 Floral Paintings. Publisher Papadakis  Publisher a copy is at the Herbarium Library at Kew Gardens England, it is a selection of Andrews work from the Floral Magazine.

Gallery

References

External links

 'Florist, Fruitist and Garden Miscellany' (1857) - Examples of botanical lithographs by Andrews at Fine Rare Prints.

19th-century English painters
English male painters
1801 births
1876 deaths
19th-century English male artists